The Lee County School System is a public school system in Lee County, Georgia, United States, based in Leesburg. It serves the communities of Leesburg and Smithville, as well as the rest of the county.

Schools

The Lee County School System has two primany schools, two elementary schools, two middle schools, one 9th grade center, and one high school.

Elementary schools 
Kinchafoonee Primary School
Lee County Elementary School
Lee County Primary School
Twin Oaks Elementary

Middle schools
Lee County Middle School - East Campus
Lee County Middle School - West Campus

High school
Lee County High School
Lee County High School - 9th Grade Campus

References

External links

School districts in Georgia (U.S. state)
Education in Lee County, Georgia